Sukna (Quechua for friend, Hispanicized spelling Sucna) is a  mountain in the Andes of Peru. It is located in the Arequipa Region, Castilla Province, on the border of the districts of Ayo and Choco. Sukna lies southwest of Qallwa.

References

Mountains of Peru
Mountains of Arequipa Region